Wang Lu may refer to:

Wang Lü (1332–1391), painter during the Yuan/Ming dynasties
Wang Lu (footballer) (1930–2007), Chinese association footballer
Wang Lu (beach volleyball) (born 1982), Chinese beach volleyball player

See also
Wanglu, a town in Yutai County, Shandong, China
Lu Wang (disambiguation)